Montana Cafe is the thirty-ninth studio album by American musician Hank Williams Jr. It was released by Warner Bros. Records in July 1986. "Country State of Mind," "Mind Your Own Business" and "When Something Is Good (Why Does It Change)" were released as singles. The album reached No. 1 on the Top Country Albums chart and has been certified Gold by the RIAA.

Track listing

Personnel

 Matt Betton – drums
 Dickey Betts – electric guitar, slide guitar, background vocals
 Dino Bradley – electric guitar
 Herbert Bruce – trombone
 Ray Carroll – trumpet
 June Carter Cash – autoharp
 Ben Cauley – trumpet
 Sonny Garrish – steel guitar
 Steve Gibson – mandolin
 Ike Harris – tuba
 Thunderhead Hawkins - electric guitar 
 Jim Horn – baritone saxophone
 Wayne Jackson – trumpet
 John Barlow Jarvis – piano
 Mike Lawler – synthesizer
 Huey Lewis – duet vocals on "You Can't Judge a Book (By Looking at the Cover)"
 "Cowboy" Eddie Long – steel guitar
 Reba McEntire – vocals on "Mind Your Own Business"
 Jerry McKinney – tenor saxophone
 Terry McMillan – harmonica, percussion
 Lamar Morris – electric guitar
 Willie Nelson – vocals on "Mind Your Own Business"
 Mark O'Connor – fiddle
 Tom Petty – vocals on "Mind Your Own Business"
 Reverend Ike – vocals on "Mind Your Own Business"
 Michael Rhodes – bass guitar
 Charles Rose – trombone
 Raul Ross – clarinet
 Henry Strzelecki – bass fiddle
 Harvey Thompson – tenor saxophone
 Wayne Turner – electric guitar
 Billy Joe Walker Jr. – acoustic guitar
 Hank Williams Jr. – lead vocals
 Paul Worley – electric guitar
 Reggie Young – electric guitar

Charts

Weekly charts

Year-end charts

References

1986 albums
Hank Williams Jr. albums
Warner Records albums
Albums produced by Barry Beckett
Albums produced by Jim Ed Norman